Mashiach is a Hebrew term for the messiah in Judaism. Mashiach may also refer to:

People
Jesus
Messiah ben Joseph 
Hasun ben Mashiach, tenth-century Karaite scholar
Menashe Masiah (b. 1973) Israeli football referee
Nimrod Mashiah (b. 1988) Israeli windsurfer

See also
Mashiach Borochoff House

Hebrew-language names